Pierre Lionel Georges Schapira (born 10 December 1944 in Algiers) is a French politician and Member of the European Parliament for the Île-de-France. He is a member of the Socialist Party, which is part of the Party of European Socialists, and sits on the European Parliament's Committee on Development.

He is also a substitute for the Committee on Foreign Affairs and a member of the delegation for relations with Israel and the ACP-EU Joint Parliamentary Assembly.

Career
 Diploma as dental surgeon (1971)
 Deputy Mayor of Paris with responsibility for international relations and the French-Speaking World
 Former Vice-President of the French Economic and Social Council (1984–2004)
 Former Commissioner, National Commission for Information Technology and Freedoms (CNIL) (1999–2004)
 Officier of the Legion of Honour

References

External links
 Official website (in French)
 European Parliament biography
 Declaration of financial interests (in French; PDF file)

1944 births
Living people
People from Algiers
MEPs for Île-de-France 2004–2009
Socialist Party (France) MEPs
Officiers of the Légion d'honneur
French city councillors